Josiah Jamison (born August 18, 1982) is a visually impaired American sprint runner. He has retinitis pigmentosa, a hereditary eye disease that affects peripheral and night vision. He began racing at the South Carolina School for the Deaf and Blind in Spartanburg and won a gold medal for the United States at the 2008 Summer Paralympics in the 100 m T12 event. He also competed at the 2012 Summer Paralympics, but was disqualified in both the 100 m and 200 m heats for violating a newly implemented rule that a guide may not separate from the runner farther than 50 cm; his 4 × 100 m relay team also failed to finish at those Paralympics. At the world championships Jamison won a gold, a silver and a bronze medal between 2006 and 2013.

References 

1982 births
Living people
People from Orangeburg County, South Carolina
Paralympic track and field athletes of the United States
Athletes (track and field) at the 2008 Summer Paralympics
Athletes (track and field) at the 2012 Summer Paralympics
Paralympic gold medalists for the United States
Medalists at the 2008 Summer Paralympics
Paralympic medalists in athletics (track and field)
Medalists at the 2007 Parapan American Games
Medalists at the 2015 Parapan American Games
American male sprinters